The Polish Bride is a 1998 Dutch film directed by Karim Traïdia and written by Kees van der Hulst. The film was selected as the Dutch entry for the Best Foreign Language Film at the 71st Academy Awards, but was not accepted as a nominee.

Cast
 Jaap Spijkers as Henk Woldring
 Monic Hendrickx as Anna Krzyzanowska
 Rudi Falkenhagen as the pimp
 Roef Ragas as the pimp's son
 Hakim Traidia as the mailman
 Soraya Traïdia as Krysztyna

Awards and nominations
Golden Globe Awards
Best Foreign Language Film (lost to Central Station)

International Film Festival of Rotterdam
Awards: AUDIENCE AWARD

Netherlands Film Festival (Golden Calf)
Best Actor (Spijkers – lost to Johan Leysen, Felice... Felice...)
Best Actress (Hendrickx, won)
Best Director (Karim Traïdia, won)

BERLIN
Award: Best European film 1999  EUROPA AWARD

AFI American Film Institute, Los Angeles
Award: Best European Entry

Selected for LA SEMAINE DE LA CRITIQUE Cannes 1998
Award: GRAND RAIL D'OR

Best Film at Braunschweig Film Festival

OSCARS 1999
Represented the Netherlands

Australian adaptation
The 2007 Australian film Unfinished Sky, also starring Monic Hendrickx, is an adaptation of this film into an Australian context.

See also
 List of submissions to the 71st Academy Awards for Best Foreign Language Film
 List of Dutch submissions for the Academy Award for Best Foreign Language Film

References

External links 
 

1998 films
1998 romantic drama films
Dutch romantic drama films
1990s Dutch-language films